Uncharted is an adventure media franchise developed by Naughty Dog, composed of video games and associated media. The core of the franchise is an eponymous series of action-adventure third-person shooter games, which follow Nathan Drake, along with Victor Sullivan and Elena Fisher, as he journeys around the world searching for historical treasures and attempting to prevent villains from harnessing the supernatural powers of various relics. The video games have had high sales, with the series as a whole selling over 41 million units by the end of 2017.

In addition to the four games of the main series, published for the PlayStation 3 and PlayStation 4, the Uncharted video game series includes a browser game, two handheld games, and a mobile game, with varying gameplay styles. The franchise also contains a film, a novel, a behind-the-scenes book, two concept art books, a comic book, a board game, two motion comics, and seven soundtrack albums or singles. The first entry of the franchise, Uncharted: Drake's Fortune, was published in 2007, while the latest video game, Uncharted 4s expansion pack Uncharted: The Lost Legacy, was published in 2017, and the latest entry, the film Uncharted, was released in 2022.

Video games

Main series

Spin-offs

Compilations

Other media

Dramatizations

Printed

Soundtracks

References

External links
Uncharted official website

Uncharted
Uncharted